Muḥammad ibn Yūsuf is an Arabic name that may refer to:

Muhammad ibn Yusuf al-Thaqafi, early 8th-century governor of the Umayyad Caliphate and brother of al-Hajjaj
Muhammad ibn Yusuf al-Kindi (897–961), Arab historian
Muhammad ibn Yūsuf al-Warrāq (904–973/4), Andalusian historian and geographer, author of a series of historical and geographical works on North Africa
Abu al-Hassan al-Amiri, Muhammad ibn Yusuf (died 992), Muslim theologian and philosopher who attempted to reconcile philosophy with religion
Muhammad ibn Yusuf al-Ilaqi, eleventh-century Persian physician from Khorasan
al-Saraqusti, Abu al-Tahir Muhammad ibn Yusuf al-Tamimi, twelfth-century Andalusi lexicographer, poet, philologist, author of the 
Ibn Hud, Abu Abd Allah Muḥammad ibn Yusuf al-Judhami (died 1238), taifa emir who controlled much of al-Andalus from 1228 to 1237
Muhammad I of Granada, Muhammad ibn Yusuf ibn Nasr (1195–1273), also known as Ibn al-Ahmar or al-Ghalib billah, first ruler of the Emirate of Granada and founder of the Nasrid dynasty
Abu Hayyan al-Gharnati, Muhammad ibn Yusuf ibn Ali ibn Yusuf ibn Hayyan (1256–1344), Quran commentator and Arabic grammarian
Ibn Zamrak, Muhammad ibn Yusuf al-Surayhi (1333–1393), Arab Andalusian poet and statesman from Granada (modern Spain)
Ahli Shirazi, Muhammad ibn Yusuf (1454–1535), Persian poet
Muhammad ibn Yusuf al-Harawi (died 1542), Persian physician from Herat (Afghanistan), author of an Arabic medical dictionary and a work on ageing